Aboutorab Esfahani, pseudonym: Toraba, (1581–1662) was a prominent Persian calligrapher of the Nastaliq script and one of the most important calligraphy students of Mir Emad.

Biography 
Aboutorab Esfahani was born in a great rich family in Isfahan. His birth date has not been mentioned in historical documents, but since his death age has been mentioned as 83 in one of Mirza Sanglakh's works, he must have been born in 1581.

His first calligraphy teacher was Molla ALi Fayezi (death: 1626). Then Esfahani continued his education with Mir Emad. Esfahani became one of the most successful students of Mir Emad. When Mir Emad was killed in 1615, he was the only person, who dared to bury Mir Emad' body.

After Mir Emad's death, he became the most famous Persian calligrapher and he could teach many calligraphers. His most famous students were Mohammad Mohsen Emami, His own sons Nour ed-Din Mohammad Esfahani and Mohammad Saleh Esfahani.

He died in 1662 at the age of 83 in Isfahan and was buried in the Lonban mosque.

References 

Artists from Isfahan
16th-century calligraphers of Safavid Iran
1581 births
1662 deaths
17th-century calligraphers of Safavid Iran
16th-century Iranian painters
17th-century Iranian painters